That's Me is a 1963 American short comedy film directed by Walker Stuart. It's written by and stars Alan Arkin and Andrew Duncan. The plot follows a young Puerto Rican guitar player trying to establish himself in New York City.

It received a nomination for the Academy Award for Best Live Action Short Film.

References

External links 
 

1963 films
American short films
1960s English-language films